

Events
January 21 – Charles Theodore Pachelbel gives a public concert in New York City, the first documented event of its kind. Pachelbel, son of the more famous Johann Pachelbel, settles in Charleston, South Carolina, where he works as an organist, harpsichordist, composer and music teacher for the rest of his life.
March 29 Johann Sebastian Bach revives his St Matthew Passion BWV 244 (BC D 3b) with some instrumentation, vocal, and textual changes from earlier version (BC D 3a) and scored separately for two choirs and orchestras (with two continuo parts) at St. Thomas Church, Leipzig.
May 12 – In celebration of the marriage of Frederick, Prince of Wales, Handel's opera Atalanta is premièred at Covent Garden Theatre.
November 25 – A three-manual, 43-stop organ, built by Gottfried Silbermann, is dedicated at the new Frauenkirche in Dresden.
December 1 – J. S. Bach gives a recital on the Silbermann organ at the Dresden Frauenkirche.
 specific date not listed
 Domenico Alberti is in Spain as Venetian ambassador.  Opera singer Farinelli is impressed by Alberti's amateur singing.
 Antonio Lotti becomes maestro di cappella at St Mark's Cathedral, Venice.
The first major instrument manufacturer in North America, John Clemm, comes to Philadelphia, where he will establish an organ and piano business.
Hanover, Virginia, hosts the first documented fiddling contest in the country.

Classical music
Carl Philipp Emanuel Bach – Keyboard Sonata in G major, H.15
Johann Sebastian Bach 
Dir zu Liebe, wertes Herze, BWV Anh.41 (authorship unknown)
George Frideric Handel 
Alexander's Feast, HWV 75 (See also: Concerto Grosso in C major, HWV 318)
Cecilia, volgi un sguardo, HWV 89
Look down, harmonious saint, HWV 124
Johann Adolf Hasse – Salve regina in A major
Giovanni Battista Pergolesi – Stabat Mater
Jan Dismas Zelenka
Missa Sanctissimae Trinitatis, ZWV 17
Alma redemptoris Mater, ZWV 126

Opera
Antonio Caldara – Temistocle
Francesco Durante – Abigaile
Mademoiselle Duval – Les Génies ou Les Caractères de l'amour
George Frideric Handel 
Atalanta HWV 35 (performed, composed 1735)
Arminio, HWV 36 (composed, first performed 12 January 1737)
Giustino, HWV 37 (composed, first performed 16 February 1737)
Berenice, HWV 38 (composition begun)
Alexander's Feast (HWV 75) (first performed February 19)
Leonardo Leo 
Farnace 
L'Olympiade
Nicola Antonio Porpora 
La Festa d'Imeneo
Mitridate (revised)
Orfeo (in collaboration with Carlo Broschi, Leonardo Vinci, Johann Adolph Hasse and Francesco Araja.)
 Giovanni Alberto Ristori – Le fate

Publications
Jean-Baptiste Barrière – 6 Cello Sonatas, Book 3
Joseph Bodin de Boismortier 
Quatre suites de pièces de clavecin, Op. 59 (Paris)
Les Voyages de l'Amour, Op. 60 (ballet) (Paris)
Six sonates, for treble viol and basso continuo, Op. 61 (Paris)
6eme Recueil d’airs à boire et sérieuxe, Op. 62 (Paris)
Six sonates, for two treble viols, Op. 63 (Paris)
Pietro Castrucci – 12 Concerti Grossi, Op. 3
Jean-Pierre Guignon 
Pieces à 2 violons, Op. 8
Nouvelles variations de divers airs et les Folies d'Espagne, Op. 9
Johann Adolph Hasse – Siroe, re di Persia (published, first performed 1733)
Jean-Marie Leclair – Première recréation de musique d’une execution facile, Op. 6 (Paris)
Pietro Locatelli – 6 Trio Sonatas, Op. 5
Franz Anton Maichelbeck – 8 Keyboard Sonatas, Op. 1
Benedetto Marcello – 6 Sonatas for 2 Cellos, Op. 2
Giovanni Batista Pergolesi – Luce degli occhi miei, P.110 (published posthumously)
Nicolo Antonio Porpora – 6 Sinfonie da camera, Op. 2
Giuseppe Sammartini 
6 Trio Sonatas, Op. 1
12 Flute Sonatas, Op. 2
Georg Christian Schemelli – Musicalisches Gesang-Buch (anthology of J.S. Bach choral settings)
Georg Philipp Telemann
VI Moralische Kantaten, for soprano and basso continuo, TWV 20:23-28 (Hamburg: [Telemann])
VI Ouvertures à 4 ou 6 (Hamburg: [Telemann])
Carlo Tessarini – 12 Violin Sonatas, Op. 3

Methods and theory publications 

 Michel Pignolet de Montéclair – Principes de musique
Jose de Torres y Martínez Bravo – Reglas generales de acompañar

Births
February 3 – Johann Georg Albrechtsberger, musician (died 1809)
June 3 – Ignaz Fränzl, violinist and composer (died 1811) 
June 28 – Gottlieb Konrad Pfeffel (died 1809)
August 15 – Johann Christoph Kellner, organist and composer (died 1803)
October 27 – James Macpherson, librettist (died 1796)
November 18 – Carl Friedrich Christian Fasch, harpsichordist and composer (died 1800) 
December 20 – Hans Moritz von Brühl (died 1809)

Deaths
February 13 – Charles Desmazures (born 1669)
March 16 – Giovanni Battista Pergolesi, composer (born 1710)
May 7 – John Weldon, composer (born 1676)
August 21 – Emanuele d'Astorga, composer (born 1681)
December 28 – Antonio Caldara, composer (born c.1670)
date unknown – Joseph Michel, chorister, composer and music teacher (born 1688)

References

 
18th century in music
Music by year